The Shattered was a glam rock influenced band from the San Francisco Bay Area of California formed in 1988.  The Shattered featured a pop punk style in the likes of Cheap Trick, The Ramones and Hanoi Rocks.  

The Shattered performed with bands of the day such as:, 
Ex- Hanoi Rocks singer Michael Monroe,  Black Cherry,  Bang Tango, Vain (band) and The Guttercats.
The Shattered frequented and performed at clubs such as The Stone (S.F.), The Cactus Club (San Jose), The Omni (Oakland), Berkeley Square, The Red Light District (Los Angeles),and The Coconut Teaser (Los Angeles)
There was a series of singles/demos recorded over the years. 
Selling through Tower Records and actually outselling major label artists and getting commercial airplay.

Out of print releases:
You Lose/ Rattlesnake Kiss-1988 
Rattlesnake Kiss/ Nobody's Darling/ Remember When-1989
Truth E.P.(produced by James Ray guitarist/songwriter of Sybil) 
When I'm Gone/ You Lose/ Tell Me-1991

The Shattered disbanded in 1992 to pursue other musical projects.

Members
Stevie Townes - Vox 1988-1990
Jeff Hicks - Guitar, Vox 1990-1992
Kevin Croall - Guitar
Steve Jennings - Bass
Todd Rhynes - Drums
Mike McShane - Guitar 1991-1992

Musical groups from the San Francisco Bay Area